Price adjustments, also called price protection, is a retail practice in the U.S. in which customers can obtain a partial refund of the purchase price of an item if they can show it on sale at a lower price within a fixed time frame. In such circumstances, retailers will do a “price adjustment,” refunding the difference between the price the customer paid and the price now available. For example, if a customer buys a TV for $300, and it drops in price by $100, they can go back to the retailer to ask for a price adjustment and get the difference returned to them, often in cash. Retailers with price adjustment policies include Macy's, Gap, and Staples.

Price adjustments are not the same as return policies. With price adjustments, retailers will refund a customer the difference in cost even if the item has already been used. Returns, on the other hand, usually need to be in unused condition. Some retailers have different policies for in-store purchase and online purchases. Many retailers also exclude certain items from price adjustments, price guarantees, or price matching (like items that were on sale to begin with).

Price adjustments are also slightly different from price-matching policies. Price matching is the practice of a retailer offering a refund of the difference between their higher price of an item and a competing retailer's lower price for the same item. Price adjustments only compare different prices at the same retailer over time.

References 

 
Survey by Pricetector, Inc taken on Jan 20, 2011 on customer loyalty

Retail pricing
Pricing